Stary Karbash (İśke Qarbaş) is a rural locality (a village) in Tavlarovsky Selsoviet, Buzdyaksky District, Bashkortostan, Russia. The population was 122 as of 2010. There is 1 street.

Geography 
Stary Karbash is located 34 km north of Buzdyak (the district's administrative centre) by road. Kartamak is the nearest rural locality.

References 

Rural localities in Buzdyaksky District